Wengyuan (postal: Yungyun) is a county in the north of Guangdong Province, China, bordering Jiangxi to the northeast. It is under the administration of Shaoguan City. It has a population of 421,756 in 2019, 99.55% of whom speak Hakka. Yao languages are spoken in some parts of the county. 0.616% of the population belongs to minority ethnic groups, most of them Yao.

The name means 'source of the Weng River', which is a tributary of the Bei River.

Wengyuan is noted for its plum blossoms and orchid floriculture, which account for 70% of China's orchid production.

Administrative divisions 
The county is responsible for the administration of eight towns:

Towns

Longxian
Bazi
Jiangwei
Guandu
Zhoubei
Wengcheng
Xinjiang

Tielong (铁龙镇), formerly known as Tielong Forest Farm

Climate

References 

 
County-level divisions of Guangdong
Shaoguan